Charles Philip Meeler (born July 3, 1948 in South Boston, Virginia) is a former pitcher who played in seven games for the Detroit Tigers in 1972. He made his major league debut on 10 May 1972 in a loss to the Chicago White Sox.

References

External links

1948 births
Living people
Detroit Tigers players
Statesville Tigers players
Batavia Trojans players
Rocky Mount Leafs players
Evansville Triplets players
Erie Tigers players
Lakeland Tigers players
Montgomery Rebels players
Toledo Mud Hens players
Major League Baseball pitchers
Baseball players from Virginia
People from South Boston, Virginia